The Swedish Basketball Cup (Swedish: Svenska Cupen) is an annual cup competition for Swedish basketball teams organized by the Swedish Basketball Federation. A total of 25 teams participate, with teams from the Swedish Basketball League (SBL) as well as from lower leagues.

For the 2019–20 season, the Swedish Cup was re-launched after the tournament was gone since the 1990s.

References

Basketball competitions in Sweden
Basketball cup competitions in Europe